Joseph R. Fogarty (born January 12, 1931) is an American attorney who served as a Commissioner of the Federal Communications Commission from 1976 to 1983.

References

1931 births
Living people
Members of the Federal Communications Commission
Rhode Island Democrats
Ford administration personnel
Carter administration personnel
Reagan administration personnel